The National Agency of Natural Resources (AKBN) is a government agency that supervises and monitors the use of natural resources in Albania. Its purpose is to maintain the interests of the State in the fields of hydrocarbons, minerals and energy. The agency oversees the development and rational use of natural resources and monitors their post-use.

References